Sassafras is a genus of three species of trees native to North America and Asia.

Sassafras may also refer to:

Plants
 Atherospermataceae, or Southern Sassafras, a southern hemisphere family of trees
 Doryphora sassafras, an Australian tree from temperate rainforests
 Sassafras albidum, the sassafras tree of eastern North America, used in tea, root beer, and gumbo filé powder
 Cinnamomum oliveri, known as Black Sassafras or Oliver's Sassafras, an Australian rain forest laurel
 Street slang for Marijuana

Vessels
USCGC Sassafras (WLB-401), United States Coast Guard buoy tender

Places
 Sassafras, New South Wales, a village in New South Wales, Australia
 Sassafras, Tasmania, a town in northern Tasmania, Australia
 Sassafras, Victoria, a city suburb of Melbourne, Victoria, Australia
 Sassafras, Indiana, an unincorporated community
 Sassafras, Maryland, a location in the United States
 Sassafras, West Virginia, an unincorporated community
 Sassafras River, a tributary of the Chesapeake Bay in Maryland and Delaware, United States
 Sassafras Mountain, the highest point in the state of South Carolina, United States

Music 
 Sassafras (band), a rock band from South Wales formed in the 1970s
 Sassafrass!, a 2018 album by Tami Neilson
 "Sassafras", a song by The Devil Wears Prada from With Roots Above and Branches Below
 "Sassafras", a song by the Helio Sequence which appears on Com Plex
 "Sassafras Roots", a song by Green Day from Dookie
 "Sassafras", a song by Billy Edd Wheeler covered by Van Dyke Parks on Songs Cycled

Animals 
 Sassafras (horse)  (1967-1988), a racehorse